"Loin d'ici" is a French language song performed by Austrian singer, songwriter, and actress Zoë. The song was released as a digital download on 5 February 2016 through Global Rockstar Music, and was written by Zoë and Christof Straub. The song represented Austria in the Eurovision Song Contest 2016.

Eurovision Song Contest

On 11 January 2016, Zoë was announced as one of the nine competing artists in the Austrian national selection Wer singt für Österreich? 2016. During the show's final, she placed fourth with the jury, but managed to qualify to the superfinal as one of the top two acts, where she was later declared the winner by Austrian televoters. She represented Austria in the Eurovision Song Contest 2016 in Stockholm, reaching the 13th position in the Grand Final with 151 points.

Track listing

Chart performance

Weekly charts

Release history

References

Eurovision songs of Austria
Eurovision songs of 2016
2015 songs
2016 singles
Zoë Straub songs
French-language songs